Wojciech Michał Olejniczak (born 10 April 1974) is a Polish leftist politician and member of the European Parliament.

He was the chairman of the Democratic Left Alliance (SLD) from 29 May 2005, to 31 May 2008 (the first chairman of that party that was not a member of Polish United Workers' Party) and the vice-speaker of Sejm since 26 October 2005. From 2 July 2003, to 31 May 2005, Olejniczak was the Minister of Agriculture and Rural Development.

He was elected to the Sejm on 25 September 2005 getting 31,471 votes in the 11th Sieradz district, running on the SLD list. He was also a member of Sejm 2001–2005. He was reelected on 21 October 2007 getting 51,865 votes in the 9th Łódź district.

On 7 June 2009 he was elected as a Member of the European Parliament for the Warsaw constituency, gaining 72,854 votes.

Internet Meme

He achieved notoriety in Poland for a speech made during the ECOSY Congress in Warsaw, Poland, which displayed his poor command of the English language. This inspired an Internet meme on the basis of his speech.

See also
 Members of Polish Sejm 2005–2007
 Members of Polish Sejm 2007–2011

References

External links
 
 Wojciech Olejniczak – parliamentary page – includes declarations of interest, voting record, and transcripts of speeches.

1974 births
Living people
People from Łowicz
Democratic Left Alliance politicians
Deputy Marshals of the Sejm of the Third Polish Republic
Members of the Polish Sejm 2001–2005
Members of the Polish Sejm 2005–2007
Agriculture ministers of Poland
Democratic Left Alliance MEPs
MEPs for Poland 2009–2014
Members of the Polish Sejm 2007–2011